Chinameca Sporting Club, commonly known as Chinameca S.C.  now called Chacarita Juniors are a Salvadoran professional football club based in San Miguel.

History

Chinameca Sporting Club
They were first team to win the top flight Primera División in 1926–1927 but have had a turbulent history, even disappearing from the local football scene for a while. They only returned to the Third Division in 2005 and withdrew from that competition in February 2010 citing lack of support from their fans.

Chacarita Juniors
They were renamed Chacarita Juniors.

Achievements
top flight Primera División: 1
1926-27

References

Defunct football clubs in El Salvador
Association football clubs established in 1914
1914 establishments in El Salvador